The Good Life is an indie rock band on Saddle Creek Records.

Started as a solo project of Cursive's frontman Tim Kasher, The Good Life quickly grew to become its own established group. The original intent of The Good Life was to provide Tim Kasher with a vehicle to perform songs that did not fit stylistically in with his long-running band Cursive. Kasher fronts the group and plays the part of the singer/songwriter.  The other members of the band include Stefanie Drootin, Ryan Fox, and Roger Lewis.  

The Good Life has its core in those four musicians, but besides Kasher can be a rotating cast of characters involving many from Saddle Creek Records. The band's name came from the original state slogan for Nebraska, the home of Kasher and Saddle Creek, before 2003, when the slogan was changed.

The Good Life released their fifth album, Everybody's Coming Down, on August 14, 2015.

Band members
Tim Kasher
Stefanie Drootin
Ryan Fox
Roger Lewis

Former members
Jiha Lee
Landon Hedges

Discography

Albums

Singles and EPs
Lovers Need Lawyers (2004 · Saddle Creek Records) - EP
Heartbroke (2007 · Saddle Creek Records) - 7" single

Compilations
Holiday Matinee, No. 2 (2000 · Better Looking Records)
song: "Tell Shipwreck I'm Sorry"
NE vs. NC (2002 · Redemption Recording Co.)
songs: "I Am an Island," "Off the Beaten Path"
Saddle Creek 50 (2003 · Saddle Creek Records)
songs: "I Am an Island," "Aftercrash"
Amos House Collection (2003 · Wishing Tree)
song: "Haunted Homecoming"
Not One Light Red: A Desert Extended (2003 · Sunset Alliance)
song: "Thin Walls Between Us"
Comes With a Smile#12 - Bonus Disk (2004 · Comes With a Smile)
song: "Grandma's Gone"
Lagniappe: A Saddle Creek Benefit for Hurricane Katrina (2005 · Saddle Creek Records)
song: "New Year's Retribution"

Videography
Lovers Need Lawyers (2005, directed by Nik Fackler)
Heartbroke (2007, directed by Alan Tanner and Rob Walters)

Orenda Fink appeared in the music video for Lovers Need Lawyers.

See also
The '89 Cubs
Bright Eyes
Consafos
Cursive
Neva Dinova

References

External links
Official website
Saddle Creek page

Indie rock musical groups from Nebraska
Musical groups from Omaha, Nebraska
Saddle Creek Records artists